Charles Emory Eakle (September 27, 1887 – June 15, 1959) was an American professional baseball player who played in 2 games for the Baltimore Terrapins during the  season. He was born in Maryland and died in Baltimore, Maryland at the age of 71.

References

External links

Major League Baseball second basemen
Baseball players from Maryland
Baltimore Terrapins players
1887 births
1959 deaths